Government Astronomer  can refer to the Commonwealth Government Astronomer or to the various other State equivalent positions that are known as "Government Astronomer":

 Commonwealth Government Astronomer
 Western Australian Government Astronomer
 South Australian Government Astronomer
 Victorian Government Astronomer